Aloeides braueri, the Brauer's copper, is a butterfly of the family Lycaenidae. It is found in South Africa, where it is known from highland hillsides covered in sour grassveld in the Eastern Cape.

The wingspan is 26–28 mm for males and 28–32 mm females. Adults are on wing from October to November and from January to February. There are two generations per year.

References

Butterflies described in 1968
Aloeides
Endemic butterflies of South Africa